William Edward Noxon (November 26, 1929 – February 24, 2016) was an American football coach. He served as the head football coach at Western State College of Colorado—now known as Western Colorado University—from 1971 to 1984, compiling a record of 87–45–2.

Noxon died on February 24, 2016, at HopeWest Hospice in Grand Junction, Colorado, from injuries he sustained in a fall the previous September.

Head coaching record

College

References

1929 births
2016 deaths
American football ends
American football halfbacks
Colorado State Rams football players
Fort Lewis Skyhawks football players
Fort Lewis Skyhawks men's basketball players
Western Colorado Mountaineers football coaches
High school football coaches in Colorado
Junior college football players in the United States
Junior college men's basketball players in the United States
Sportspeople from Denver
Players of American football from Denver
Basketball players from Denver